Igor Armenovich Sarukhanov (born on April 6, 1956, Samarkand) is a Russian pop musician, composer and artist of Armenian descent, as well as Meritorious Artist of Russia (1997).

He finished the Musical college of Moscow. He was a member of Tsvety Soviet rock band, worked with Alla Pugachyova, Anne Veski etc. Since 1985 he started a solo-career and already has 10 albums released during this period, including 4 LPs in USSR. He was most popular artist in USSR, like Yuri Antonov, Valeri Leontiev.

References

External links
Official site
Igor Sarukhanov at Peoples.ru

1956 births
Soviet musicians
Uzbekistani musicians
Russian people of Armenian descent
Living people
Honored Artists of the Russian Federation
Soviet male singers
Soviet composers
Soviet male composers
Armenian composers
Russian composers
Russian male composers
Soviet Armenians
Uzbekistani people of Armenian descent
People from Samarkand
20th-century Russian male singers
20th-century Russian singers
Russian chanson